The 2019 Dafabet US Darts Masters was the third staging of the tournament by the Professional Darts Corporation. It was the first event in the 2019 World Series of Darts. The tournament featured 16 players (8 PDC representatives, and 8 North American representatives), and was held at the Mandalay Bay in Las Vegas on 4–5 July 2019.

Gary Anderson was the defending champion, after beating Rob Cross 8–4 in the 2018 final, but was beaten 8–6 in the quarter-finals by Gerwyn Price.

Nathan Aspinall won his third PDC title, and his first on the World Series with an 8–4 win over Michael Smith in the final.

Prize money
The total prize fund was £60,000.

Qualifiers
The eight PDC representatives are:

  Michael van Gerwen (quarter-finals)
  Rob Cross (quarter-finals)
  Daryl Gurney (quarter-finals)
  Gary Anderson (quarter-finals)
  Gerwyn Price (semi-finals)
  Peter Wright (semi-finals)
  Michael Smith (runner-up)
  Nathan Aspinall (champion)

The North American qualifier winners were:
  Jeff Smith (first round)
  Leonard Gates (first round)
  Danny Baggish (first round)
  Elliot Milk (first round)

The top 4 North American Order of Merit qualifiers were:
  Shawn Brenneman (first round)
  Darin Young (first round)
  Jim Long (first round)
  Gary Mawson (first round)

Bracket

References

US Darts Masters
World Series of Darts
Sports competitions in Las Vegas
US Darts Masters 2019
2019 in sports in Nevada
US Darts Masters